The Czarna  - is a small watercourse in south-eastern Poland, a right tributary of the Łęg River, with a length of . Its source is in the village of Styków in Subcarpathian Voivodeship.

References

Tributaries of the Łęg